Frank Anthony Iero, Jr. (born October 31, 1981) is an American musician who is the rhythm guitarist and backup vocalist of the rock band My Chemical Romance and a guitarist in the supergroup L.S. Dunes. He was also the lead vocalist of the post-hardcore band Leathermouth. He has a solo project titled "Frank Iero and the Future Violents" (formerly "frnkiero andthe cellabration" and "Frank Iero and the Patience"). He released his debut solo album titled Stomachaches on August 26, 2014.

Early life
He was born in Belleville, New Jersey. As a child, he suffered numerous bouts of bronchitis and ear infections, which meant he spent a lot of his childhood in the hospital. Iero is lactose intolerant and has other various food allergies. He attended Queen of Peace High School. He went to Rutgers University on a scholarship, but dropped out to go on tour with My Chemical Romance.

Iero's parents split when he was young and he grew up living with his mother, who lent out her basement to her son's many band practices; his father and grandfather were musicians and both were big influences on Iero when he was young. His father had taught him to play drums, but Iero later began playing the guitar.

Music career

Early bands and Pencey Prep (1997–2002)
Frank started playing in local bands on the New Jersey punk scene when aged 11. Before joining My Chemical Romance he served as frontman for the punk band Pencey Prep. The band released an album, Heartbreak in Stereo, on the independent Eyeball Records before disbanding. Whilst playing with Pencey Prep, he became friends with Gerard Way and the other My Chemical Romance members, became a fan of their original demo and helped them get their first shows. After his band broke up, Frank played in several bands, including I Am A Graveyard, Hybrid, and Sector 12 before being offered the slot of rhythm guitar in My Chemical Romance.

My Chemical Romance (2002–2013)

Iero joined My Chemical Romance in 2002 and was featured on two tracks, "Honey, This Mirror Isn't Big Enough for the Two of Us" and "Early Sunsets Over Monroeville", on their debut album I Brought You My Bullets, You Brought Me Your Love. Iero performed on the band's second studio album Three Cheers for Sweet Revenge, released on June 8, 2004. My Chemical Romance released their third studio album, The Black Parade, on October 24, 2006. My Chemical Romance's fourth and final studio album Danger Days: The True Lives of the Fabulous Killjoys was released on November 22, 2010. The band announced their breakup on March 22, 2013.

Leathermouth and side projects (2007–2016)
Iero fronted the hardcore punk quintet, Leathermouth, who released their debut album XO in January 2009, on Epitaph Records. The band split later in 2010. He is involved in a tribute band to The Cure named The Love Cats, after the song of the same name, and played bass with Reggie and the Full Effect on their farewell tour. His first solo song This Song Is A Curse was released as a bonus track on the official soundtrack to the Tim Burton film, Frankenweenie. He later posted an anti-Xmas track he recorded as a joke in 15 minutes, and followed that up with a cover of the song 'Be My Baby', originally made famous by The Ronettes.

On December 7, 2010, Iero left the record company Skeleton Crew that he and his wife had co-founded in order to concentrate on his family and his music with My Chemical Romance, stating that although he would have loved to carry on, he could not juggle his career with the band, the new additions to his family (newborn daughters), and co-running a business . He was a judge for the 7th annual Independent Music Awards to support independent artists.

In early 2013 Iero and James Dewees announced that they were working on a new project, a digital hardcore act called Death Spells. They also announced a tour supporting Mindless Self Indulgence and a performance at the Skate and Surf Festival in New Jersey. Starting a week before the Mindless Self Indulgence tour, Death Spells posted a short demo of a new song each night at midnight, culminating this with their first full single Where Are My Fucking Pills? and an accompanying music video. A full-length album was expected to be released in late 2013 but was delayed until 2016, when their album Nothing Above, Nothing Below was released on July 29th of that year.

During Death Spells' initial inactivity in 2013, Iero performed new solo songs live and posted others to his Soundcloud, then implied he had a full album worth of songs wrote with more content being created on a continuous basis. This was confirmed to be for a solo album.

Solo career (2013–present)
On November 28, 2013, he announced via his official website and his Twitter account that a two-track release entitled "For Jamia..." would be released digitally and via limited vinyl on December 10.  After his former band broke up, Frank began writing songs in his home studio. Throughout the rest of 2013 he started playing a couple of songs live at events, posted a demo of "joyriding" and recorded a full-length album. Frank plays everything on the album except for drums which were handled by former My Chemical Romance drummer Jarrod Alexander. He also assembled a touring band composed of Evan Nestor, Rob Hughes and Matt Olsson. In June 2014 he announced his signing to Staples Records and his debut album called Stomachaches due out August 25, under the moniker frnkiero andthe cellabration. This was followed up with tour dates (a support slot on the Taking Back Sunday and The Used co-headline US fall tour) and a debut single called "Weighted". On August 4, 2014. he released the music video for this song. A second single and accompanying video for the song "Joyriding" was released. The band opened for Mallory Knox in the UK in November 2014 on their first overseas run. The band announced headline dates for 2015 in Mexico, the US and Europe and are playing Reading and Leeds festivals. The band also opened for Against Me in the US on a summer tour and ended the year on a headline run.

They performed two acoustic shows in New Jersey showcasing new material and announcing they were go into studio to record a second album in two weeks. On May 22, 2016, he officially announced recording a new album and an Australia tour, with a name change to the band which is now known as Frank Iero and the Patience. The band performed at Shadow of the City with The 1975 in New Jersey and are playing both Riot Fest dates (Denver and Chicago) in September 2016. After a motor vehicle accident that injured Iero and his bandmates all remaining 2016 dates were canceled. Iero released his second studio album titled Parachutes on October 28, and returned to touring during 2017.

On December 31, 2018, Iero announced his new solo moniker, Frank Iero and the Future Violents. He released his third solo studio album, Barriers, under the new moniker on May 31, 2019. Loudwire named it one of the 50 best rock albums of 2019.

Live band members
Frank Iero and the Future Violents
 Frank Iero – lead vocals, guitars
 Evan Nestor – guitars, percussion, backing vocals
 Matt Armstrong – bass guitar
 Tucker Rule – drums, percussion
 Kayleigh Goldsworthy - keyboards, violin, mandolin, backing vocals

Frank Iero and the Patience
 Frank Iero – lead vocals, guitars
 Evan Nestor – guitars, backing vocals
 Steve Evetts – bass guitar
 Matt Olson – drums, percussion, backing vocals

frnkiero andthe cellabration.
 Frank Iero – lead vocals, guitars
 Evan Nestor – guitars, backing vocals
 Rob Hughes – bass guitar, backing vocals
 Matt Olson – drums, percussion, backing vocals

Timeline

My Chemical Romance Reunion (2019)
On October 31, 2019, My Chemical Romance announced they would be reuniting with a date in Los Angeles on December 20 and a new merchandise line. They announced that they would also be playing shows in Australia, New Zealand, and Japan in 2020. The tour was later postponed to 2022, due to the COVID-19 pandemic.

Equipment
In the earlier days of My Chemical Romance, Iero mainly used Gibson SG's & Epiphone Les Paul guitars (most notably his white Les Paul nicknamed 'Pansy' which proved popular amongst his fans but has since been broken while onstage) and Marshall amps. He has since switched to using Gibson Les Pauls (with the Neck Pick-up removed) and occasionally uses a Gibson SG. He also used a Fender Stratocaster in the Desolation Row video. In 2011, he collaborated with Epiphone to design the Wilshire Phant-O-Matic guitar, which he used onstage for the My Chemical Romance 'World Contamination' Tour, the Honda Civic Tour and for the Reading and Leeds festivals. He also uses the Orange Rockerverb MKII 100 head and Orange 160 Watt Guitar 4x10 Vintage Cabinet. He primarily uses a Boss BD-2 Blues Driver pedal as his main overdrive.

Personal life and political views

Iero has many tattoos including logos for the bands Black Flag and The Misfits, symbols of his love for his home state, New Jersey, a matching 'revenge' tattoo with James Dewees and others by acclaimed tattoo artist Kat Von D: a Frankenstein's monster and portraits of his grandmothers and grandfather, all of which were featured in Von D's book High Voltage Tattoo and the latter of which was done on an episode of her reality show LA Ink in which Iero was featured. 

On February 5, 2007 Iero married his long-term girlfriend Jamia Nestor after proposing on May 25, 2006 during the recording of The Black Parade. On September 7, 2010, Iero announced on the My Chemical Romance official website that he and his wife Jamia had become parents of twin girls. On April 6, 2012, he announced via his official Twitter account that his wife had given birth to their son.

On October 13, 2016, Iero was injured in a motor vehicle accident. As he and his band unloaded their van for a show in Sydney, Australia, a passenger bus with no passengers hit them. Iero was dragged about 10 feet along the curb by the bus and credits "an enormous rucksack" for saving his life that day. He canceled all remaining 2016 shows, and would later speak about that day saying "It's incredible to me that we're all still alive. No one that witnessed the accident thought that we would be."

In response to Donald Trump winning the United States presidential election of 2016, Iero tweeted, "I feel sad and ashamed. This morning, all I could say to my kids when they woke up was 'I'm so sorry.'"

Discography

As frnkiero and the cellabration
Stomachaches (2014)

As Frank Iero and the Patience
Parachutes (2016)
Keep The Coffins Coming EP (2017)

As Frank Iero and the Future Violents
Barriers (2019)
Heaven Is a Place, This Is a Place EP (2021)

Solo
"This Song Is a Curse" (2012)
For Jamia (2012)
"B.F.F." (2014)
"Extraordinary Girl" cover for Kerrang Does American Idiot (2014)

With Pencey Prep
Heartbreak in Stereo (2001)

With Reggie and the Full Effect
No Country for Old Musicians (2013)

With My Chemical Romance

 I Brought You My Bullets, You Brought Me Your Love (2002)
 Three Cheers for Sweet Revenge (2004)
 The Black Parade (2006)
 Danger Days: The True Lives of the Fabulous Killjoys (2010)

With Leathermouth
XO (2009)
With Death Spells
Nothing Above, Nothing Below (2016)

References

External links

My Chemical Romance official website

1981 births
Living people
American male singers
American rock guitarists
American male guitarists
American rock singers
My Chemical Romance members
American LGBT rights activists
American people of Italian descent
Singers from New Jersey
People from Belleville, New Jersey
People from Kearny, New Jersey
Rhythm guitarists
Guitarists from New Jersey
21st-century American singers
Reggie and the Full Effect members